Fẹ́mi is a common Nigerian given unisex name of Yoruba origin which means "love Me".
Femi is most commonly a diminutive form of "Olufemi" (or Olúfẹ́mi) which means "The Lord loves me" ("Olú" means Lord, Leader, or the "Prominent one," in the Yoruba language). "Olufemi" can also be diminutive of "Olúwafẹ́mi". Other full forms of the name include Olorunfemi (God loves me), Jesufemi (Jesus loves me), Nifemi (Have my love), Babafemi (Father loves me), Obafemi (The King loves me), Adefemi (Royalty loves me), Ifafemi (Ifa loves me) etc.

People

Acting
 Femi Taylor, British dancer and actress
 Femi Emiola, American actress
 Femi Oyeniran, British actor

Art
Femi Ford, American Artist

Politics
 Femi Fani-Kayode (born 1960), Nigerian politician
 Femi Gbaja Biamila (born 1962), Nigerian politician
 Femi Oluwole (born 1990), British political activist
 Femi Pedro (born 1955), Nigerian politician
 Femi Okurounmu, Nigerian politician, Senator for Ogun Central
 Femi Adesina, Nigerian journalist and government official
 Obafemi Awolowo, Nigerian politician, statesman, and nationalist who played a key role in Nigeria's independence movement.

Sport
 Femi, nickname of Oluwafemi Ajilore (born 1985), footballer now playing for FC Groningen
 Femi Babatunde (born 1986), Nigerian footballer now playing for Kwara United F.C.
 Femi Ilesanmi (born 1991), English professional footballer
 Femi Joseph (born 1990), Nigerian footballer now playing for Liberty Professionals F.C.
 Femi Opabunmi (born 1985), footballer now playing for Shooting Stars FC
 Femi Orenuga (born 1993), English footballer now playing for Everton

Writing and journalism
 Femi Osofisan (born 1946), Nigerian writer
 Femi Euba, Nigerian actor and playwright
 Femi Oguns, British playwright
 Femi Oke (born 1966), British TV journalist, now in New York
 Caleb Femi, British poet and former young people’s laureate for London.
 Femi Johnson, Nigerian TV journalist with the Nigerian Television Authority (NTA)

Law
Femi Falana, Nigerian Lawyer and human rights activist.

Health
 Femi Oshagbemi, Nigerian born Pharmacist, Epidemiologist and Public health expert
Femi Ojo, Nigeria born Psychiatric Registered Nurse, and Public Health Expert, in California

Other
 Femi Otedola (born 1967), Nigerian billionaire businessman
 Femi Kuti (born 1962), Nigerian musician and the eldest son of afrobeat pioneer Fela Kuti
 Femi John Femi (born 1945), Chief of Air Staff of the Nigerian Air Force
 Femi Temowo, British jazz musician

See also
 La Fémis the National School of Image and Sound Professions

References 

Yoruba given names
Unisex given names